Matthias Kaul (29 January 1949 – 1 July 2020) was a German percussionist and composer of classical music.

Life and career 
Born in Hamburg, West Germany, Matthias Kaul studied percussion at the Hochschule für Musik und Theater Hamburg and for five years was a member of the ensemble Hinz & Kunst in Hamburg. He performed as a guest musician with several orchestras of Northern Germany. From 1977 until 1980 he traveled through Africa in order to study the traditional music of the Xhosa, Samburu  and Maasai  tribes. In 1983 he founded the ensemble l'art pour l'art. In 1990, Matthias Kaul with the American violinist Malcolm Goldstein began performing in an improvisational duo. Matthias Kaul’s work comprises more than 100 compositions including chamber music, choral music, audio drama and opera. Since 1987, he has performed as a percussionist and glass harmonica player in various radio recordings and on festivals. Recordings of his work were published alongside those of Alvin Lucier, John Cage, Vinko Globokar and Christian Wolff. Mathias Kaul invented numerous musical instruments such as the “Matthias Kaul overtone drum” and the overtone triangle. With his wife, the flautist Astrid Schmeling, he taught a yearly composition master class for children since 1999.

Awards and recognition 
 German "Echo Klassik" Award for „Haltbar gemacht“ in the category „Classical music for children“ (2012)
 "Deutscher Schallplattenpreis" for „Haltbar gemacht“ (2012)
 "Junge Ohren Award" for his composition master class for children in Winsen (2011)<ref>Junge Ohren Preis zum 6. Mal an innovative Musikvermittlungsprojekte vergeben In:nmz Neue Musikzeitung kiz-Nachrichten21.11.2011.</ref>
 Advancement award music education for his composition master class for children in Winsen (2009)
 Nomination for the German Record Critics' Award for „Bread and Roses" (2003), „Toucher" (2004) and „Cover Versions“ (2007)

 Works 

 Chamber music (selection)
 Concerto for panorama horn and ensemble (2015)
 Recycling – for 5 percussionists (2012)
 Stuff from Above – for 4 percussionists (2011)
 Wheeled – for 5 percussionists with 5 bicycles (2010)
 Bell Air – for 6 percussionists with 36 bells (2010)
 Töne – for 6 players with 18 flowerpots (2009)
 Salty – for accordion, double bass and playback (2008)
 fremd, bestimmt – for 6 vocalists with voicespeakers (2008)
 Some Changes – for voice, flute, guitar and percussion (2007)
 Delikatessen – for 3 players in a wurst shack (2006)
 Silence Is my Voice – for voice with voicespeaker playback (2005)
 Kafkas Heidelbeeren - Imaginäres Vokal- und Instrumentaltheater (2005)
 Listen this is for You, Kona – for percussion and feedbackbottle (2004)

 Opera  
 Relax Kafkas Heidelbeeren Electric Bath – für einen Performer

 Opera for children 
 Kuckuck im Koffer Die Menschenfresserin Oliver Twist (2004) Audio drama 

 My Snare Drum gently weeps (2017)
 Fake Dimensions (2013)
 Umbauter Raum (2013)
 Schrammen (2011)
 Audible Edibles (2009)
 Some Rooms in my room (2006)
 Electric Bath – für einen badenden Schlagzeuger(2003–2004)
 Das Buch der schönen Stimmen with E. Bohde (1997)
 Fuge mit einigen Freiheiten with E. Bohde (1996)
 Undine geht'' with E. Bohde (1994)

Discography 

 John Cage – Variations II, Eight Whiskus, Music for Two Ryoanji (Matthias Kaul: Percussion, Glas Harmonica); WERGO
 Christian Wolff – Bread and Roses (Matthias Kaul: Percussion, Voice, Wheel Fiddle); WERGO
 Alvin Lucier – Nothing is Real (Matthias Kaul: Percussion, Voice, Piano); WERGO
 Vinko Globokar – Toucher  (Matthias Kaul: Percussion and Voice); WERGO
 John Cage – Cage after Cage (Matthias Kaul: Percussion); WERGO

References

External links 
 
 L´art pour l´art
 

1949 births
2020 deaths
Musicians from Hamburg
Hochschule für Musik und Theater Hamburg alumni
German classical composers
German male classical composers
German percussionists